Gossia fragrantissima, the sweet myrtle or small-leaved myrtle, is a shrub or small tree of eastern Australia. A plant with a ROTAP rating of 3EC-, endangered by extinction. 
Found in sub tropical rainforests near streams, from near Woodburn, New South Wales to Nambour in south eastern Queensland. It features fragrant flowers, hence the specific epithet fragrantissima. White flowers grow from October to February.

The sweet myrtle may grow to seven metres tall. Bark is rough, fawn brown in colour, often flaking off in small particles. The berry matures in January and February, globular in shape, 4 to 6 mm in diameter. It may appear green, yellow, orange or red. The fruit has four persistent calyx lobes. Leaves are opposite on the stem, broad ovate, 1.5 to 5 cm long, 8 to 25 mm wide.

An intra-marginal leaf vein is usually absent. Leaves are without toothed edges and have only 5 to 8 lateral veins, only visible on the underside. Gossia acmenoides and Gossia bidwillii have 15 to 20 lateral veins. Regeneration is difficult from seed, and cuttings seldom strike. The former habitat is now mostly destroyed for housing and agriculture.

References

Flora of New South Wales
Flora of Queensland
Myrtales of Australia
Trees of Australia
fragrantissima
Taxa named by Ferdinand von Mueller
Taxa named by George Bentham